Trevor Coppola is an actor, musician from Santa Monica, California. The films he has acted in include Little Blue Pill, The Hunchback, Matilda, The Bank Job, Lucky Numbers and 3:10 to Yuma  and Vikingdom. As a musician, he is a cellist and classically trained singer.

Background

Film and television
In the early 1990s he had a small part in the television series Love & War, episode "One Strike, You're Out". He played the part of Sal in the film, Lucky Numbers which was directed by Nora Ephron and starred John Travolta and Lisa Kudrow. In 2007, he acted in the Western 3:10 to Yuma. It starred Russell Crowe and Christian Bale. In it, he played the part of William Marsh.  In 2008, he had a part in the thriller The Bank Job which was directed by Roger Donaldson.  
In the 2010 comedy Little Blue Pill which was directed by Aaron Godfred, he was one of the leading actors and acted alongside Aaron Kuban, Adam Carr, Rosie Tisch, Gerold Wunstel and Jonathan Ahdout and Gerold Wunstel. He played the part of ruthless Phalitech executive, John Kilter.  In the same year he played the part of Dr. Trevor Gibson in the film The Hunchback. 
In 2013, he starred in the Yangzom Brauen directed film Who Killed Johnny playing the part of Wulf. In the same year, he was in Vikingdom which was a fantasy, action, adventure that starred Dominic Purcell and Natassia Malthe. In it he played the part of Geat. 
In 2014, he was part of a reality show hosted by Erin J Morgart. In Empire of the Heart which was released in 2017, he played Jake Fishel.

Other
In March 2014, he was at the March issue launch party for the Californian Naluda Magazine. Later that year, he was at the International Italian Festival of Neapolitan song for an award presentation.

Filmography

Films

Television series

Music
 Across the Universe  (musician: cellist) / (singer) - (2007)

In April 2015, Coppola performed with media artist Dilee and acoustic band backing band Cori Jacobs at the Voodoo Lounge at the House of Blues. This was said to be one of the last performances as the club was due to close its doors permanently.

References

External links
 

American male film actors
American male television actors
Living people
People from Santa Monica, California
Male actors from Santa Monica, California
Musicians from Santa Monica, California
American cellists
Year of birth missing (living people)